Henri de Royer-Dupré (29 October 1876 – 8 December 1960) was a French equestrian. He competed in two events at the 1924 Summer Olympics.

References

External links
 

1876 births
1960 deaths
French male equestrians
Olympic equestrians of France
Equestrians at the 1924 Summer Olympics
Sportspeople from Chartres